Vivien Garry (1920 – December 1, 2008) was a jazz bassist. She led the Vivien Garry Quintet (which, on at least one date, included Edna Williams of the International Sweethearts of Rhythm on trumpet and Ginger Smock on violin) and the Vivien Garry Trio (which included her husband, Arv Garrison, on guitar and Wini Beatty on piano).

Discography
Please note the various different spellings of Ms. Garry's name...these are taken from the actual record labels.
Premier Records: 
29006    Vivien Gary Trio- Flying Home // Mop Mop (rec. 1944)
29007    Vivien Gary Trio- Seven Come Eleven // I've Got To, That's All (rec. 1944) - note: these four songs feature Lex Zaharik (p), Arv Garrison (g), Vivien Gary (b, vocal).
Guild Records:
124 	 Vivian Garry Trio- Relax Jack // Altitude (rec. 1945) - note: these two songs feature Teddy Kaye (p, vocal), Arv Garrison (g, vocal), Vivian Garry (b, vocal).
Black & White Records:                                                           
1216     The Hip Chicks- I Surrender Dear // Moonlight On Turhan Bay (rec. 1945) - note: A side features a guest vocal by Vivian Garry.
Sarco Records (a subsidiary of Gotham Records):
101      Vivien Garry Quartet- Hopscotch // Where You At (rec. 1945; rel. 5-46) 
102      Vivien Garry Quartet- I Surrender Dear // I've Got To, That's All (rec. 1945; rel. 5-46) 
103      Vivian Garry Quartet- Tonsillectomy // These Foolish Things (rec. 1945; rel. 6-46)
104      Vivian Garry Quartet- Rip Van Winkle // Stick Around (rec. 1945; rel. 6-46) - note: these eight songs feature George Handy (p, vocal), Arv Garrison (g, vocal), Vivian Garry (b, vocal), Roy Hall (d).
V-Disc Records:
690B     Vivian Garry Trio- 1) Where You At; 2) Baby I'm Gone (rel. 10-46) - note: these two songs feature Wini Beatty (p, vocal), Arv Garrison (g, vocal), Vivian Garry (b, vocal); the first side of this record (690A) features three songs by Les Paul & His Trio.
AFRS Jubilee (radio program transcriptions): 
203     Vivien Garry Trio- 1) Get You, Gertrude; 2) Prisoner Of Love (rel. 11-46) - note: these two songs feature Wini Beatty (p, vocal), Arv Garrison (g), Vivien Garry (b, vocal).
205     Vivien Garry- I'm In The Mood For Love (rel. 11-46) - note: this song features Benny Carter (as), Sonny White (p), Thomas Moultree (b), Percy Brice (d), Vivien Garry (vocal).
RCA Victor Records:
20-2352  Vivien Garry Quintet- I'm In The Mood For Love // Operation Mop (Edna's Stomp) (rec. 9-46; rel. 8-47)
40-0144  Vivien Garry Quintet- A Woman's Place Is In The Groove (Sycamore Blues) // Body And Soul (rec. 9-46; rel. 1-48) - note: these four songs feature Ginger Smock (vln), Edna Williams (tp), Wini Beatty (p), Vivien Garry (b), Dody Jeshke (d).
Signature Records:
1004 	 Leo Watson with Vic Dickenson Quintet- Jingle Bells // Snake Pit (rec. 9-46; rel. 12-46)
1007 	 Leo Watson with Vic Dickenson Quintet- Tight And Gay // Sonny Boy (rec. 9-46; rel. 4-47) - note: these four songs feature Vic Dickenson (tb), Eddie Heywood Jr. or Leonard Feather (p), Arv Garrison (g), Vivien Garry (b), Harold "Doc" West (d), Leo Watson (vocal).
Exclusive Records:
11X      Buddy Baker & His Orchestra- I'm Stuck With A Sticker // Sleepy Time Down South (rel. 12-46) - note: A side features a guest vocal by Vivien Garry.
235      Rickey Jordan with Vivien Garry Trio- A.B.C. Blues // Blues In The Storm (rec. 10-46; rel. 1-47)
237      Rickey Jordan with Vivien Garry Trio- Rickey's Blues // Night And Day (rec. 10-46; rel. 1-47) - note: these four songs feature Teddy Kaye (p), Arv Garrison (g), Vivien Garry (b), Ed "Sharkey" Hall (d), Rickey Jordan (vocal); add Teddy Buckner (tp), Les Robinson (as), Lucky Thompson (ts) on "A.B.C. Blues". 
Miltone Records:
5220     Vivian Garry & The Blenders- Tenderly // ??? (rel. ?-47)
5241     Vivian Garry & The Blenders- A Little Bird Told Me // ??? (rel. ?-48)
Superb Records:
600      Eddy Edell Four with Vivien Garry: Wha! Hopp'n // I Don't Know Why (rel. ?-49)
Webster Records: 
WE507    Dick Taylor Orchestra- Illusion Of Love // Don't Slam That Door (rel. 4-50) - note: B side features a guest vocal by Vivien Garry.    
WE508    Dick Taylor Orchestra- Sentimental Baby // The Bread And Butter Song (rel. 4-50) - note: B side features a guest vocal by Vivien Garry.
WE510    Dick Taylor & Vivian Garry- Go On About Your Bizness // The Three Sharps- Boggin' In The Swamp (rel. 7-50)
Skylark Records:
SK519    Vivien Garry & Dick Taylor- Home Isn't Home Without You // Vivien Garry- Rainbow Romance (rel. 3-51)
SK521    Vivien Garry- The Popcorn Man // The Knightingales- The Old Carousel (rel. 3-51)
SK525    Vivien Garry- Campus Room // Trading Kisses With You (rel. 10-51)
SK526    Vivienne Garry with Dick Taylor & His Taylor Made Music- I Get A Kick Out Of You // Just Supposin' (rel. 10-51)
SK527    Vivienne Garry with Dick Taylor & His Taylor Made Music- Whispering // Love Me (rel. 10-51)
SK537    The Lighthouse All Stars- You Know I'm In Love With You // Desire (rel. 5-52) - note: these two songs feature Shorty Rogers (tp), Milt Bernhart (tb), Jimmy Giuffre (ts), Frank Patchen (p), Howard Rumsey (b), Shelly Manne (d), Vivienne Garry (vocal).

References

External links
 Jazz Musician Vivian Garry 1940s Bassist 

American jazz double-bassists
2008 deaths
Women double-bassists
1920 births